Cionel Félix Pérez Viera (born April 21, 1996) is a Cuban professional baseball pitcher for the Baltimore Orioles of Major League Baseball (MLB). In 2016 he signed with the Houston Astros as an international free agent. Perez made his Major League debut in 2018 for the Astros. He has also played for the Cincinnati Reds.

Career

Houston Astros
Pérez played two seasons for Matanzas of the Cuban National Series. In September 2016, he signed a deal worth $5.15 million with the Houston Astros as an international free agent. The contract was voided in October due an issue in his physical. In December, he agreed to a new deal with the Astros worth $2 million.

Pérez made his professional debut with the Quad Cities River Bandits in 2017. He was later that season promoted to the Buies Creek Astros and Corpus Christi Hooks. In 21 total games (16 starts) between the three clubs, he posted a 6-4 record and 4.13 ERA with a 1.29 WHIP. The Astros added him to their 40-man roster after the season. Perez made his Major League debut on July 11, 2018. In 2019, he played for the GCL Astros, Fayetteville Woodpeckers, and the Round Rock Express, going 3–1 with a 4.94 ERA over 54.2 innings. He appeared in 5 games for the Astros in 2019, going 1–1 with a 10.00 ERA over 9 innings. In 2020 for Houston, Pérez made 7 appearances, registering a 2.84 ERA with 8 strikeouts in 6.1 innings of work.

Cincinnati Reds
On January 23, 2021, the Astros traded Pérez to the Cincinnati Reds for Luke Berryhill.

Baltimore Orioles
The Baltimore Orioles claimed Pérez off waivers on November 24, 2021.

On June 12, 2022, Pérez recorded his first career save in a 10-7 win over the Kansas City Royals. Pérez made 66 appearances for Baltimore in 2022, pitching to a stellar 7-1 record and 1.40 ERA with 55 strikeouts in 57.2 innings pitched.

References

External links

1996 births
Living people
Baseball players from Havana
Cuban League players
Major League Baseball players from Cuba
Cuban expatriate baseball players in the United States
Major League Baseball pitchers
Houston Astros players
Cincinnati Reds players
Baltimore Orioles players
Cocodrilos de Matanzas players
Gulf Coast Astros players
Quad Cities River Bandits players
Buies Creek Astros players
Fayetteville Woodpeckers players
Corpus Christi Hooks players
Fresno Grizzlies players
Round Rock Express players